The Order of Isabella the Catholic is a Spanish civil order and honor granted to persons and institutions in recognition of extraordinary services to the homeland or the promotion of international relations and cooperation with other nations. The Order is open not only to Spaniards; it has been granted to many foreigners.

The Order was created 1815 by King Ferdinand VII in honor of Queen Isabella I as the Real y Americana Orden de Isabel la Católica ("Royal and American Order of Isabella the Catholic") with the intent of "rewarding the firm allegiance to Spain and the merits of Spanish citizens and foreigners in good standing with the Nation and especially in those exceptional services provided in pursuit of territories in America and overseas." The Order was reorganized by royal decree on 26 July 1847, with the name "Royal Order of Isabella the Catholic", reflecting the loss of the mainland possessions in the Americas after the Spanish American wars of independence.

History
The Order of Isabel the Catholic was instituted by King Ferdinand VII on 14 March 1815. The original statutes of the Order were approved by Royal Decree of 24 March, with membership made in three classes: Grand Cross, and Knights of First and Second Class. Ferdinand VII was declared the Order's Founder, Head, and Sovereign. On 7 October 1816, at the suggestion of the Chapter of the Order, the Knights of the first class were renamed Commanders and the second class were renamed Knights.

By royal decree of 26 July 1847, Isabella II reorganised the four royal orders in Spain: the Order of the Golden Fleece, the Langues of Aragon and Castile of the Order of Saint John of Jerusalem, the Order of Charles III, and the Order of Isabella the Catholic. The latter was reserved to reward exclusively the services rendered in the Overseas territories. The classes of the order became Knight, Commander, Commander by Number, and Grand Cross. The concession and tests of nobility was suppressed in all the Royal Orders. By royal decree of 28 October 1851, no concessions of Grand Cross of any orders were to be made without the proposal of the Council of Ministers and concessions for the lower classes with the proposal of the Secretary of State.

After the establishment of the First Republic, the Order was declared to be extinguished by Decree of 29 March 1873 as deemed to be incompatible with the republican government. Use of the various insignias was allowed to those who possessed them. When King Alfonso XII ascended to the throne, the Order was reestablished by Decree of 7 January 1875.

During the minority of Alfonso XIII, his mother and Regent, Maria Cristina, signed the royal decrees of 15 April 1889 and 25 October 1900. Among other things, they sought to impose entry into the Order by the category of Knight, to prohibit the use of decorations until the corresponding title was obtained, and to ratify the obligation that the Grand Cross be awarded with the agreement of the Council of Ministers and for conferees to be published in the Official Gazette. By Royal Decree of 14 March 1903, the Silver Cross of the Order was created, and by Royal Decree of 15 April 1907, the Silver and Bronze Medals.

In Royal Decree 1118, of 22 June 1927, the superior grade of Knights of the Collar was created, to be awarded to prominent personalities of extraordinary merit. It also provides that women can also be decorated with either the lazo or banda.

The Provisional Government of the Republic, by decree of 24 July 1931, abolished all orders under the Ministry of State, except for the Order of Isabella the Catholic. The regulations approved by decree of 10 October 1931 introduced a new degree: Officer (Oficial). By decree of 8 August 1935, it was established that the first degree in the Order of Isabella the Catholic was that of the Grand Cross, the Collar being reserved exclusively for very exceptional cases.

In 1938, Franco, by decree of 15 June, restored the Order in its traditional meaning: to reward meritorious services rendered to the country by nationals and foreigners. The order's regulations were approved by Decree of 29 September 1938. According to the 1938 regulations, the order consisted of the following grades: Knight of the Collar, Knight Grand Cross, Commander by Number, Commander, Knight, and Silver Cross. Decree 1353/1971, of 5 June, re-incorporated the rank of Officer, placing it between the grades of Knight and Commander. Thus, the Order consisted of the following grades: Knight of the Collar, Knight of the Grand Cross, Banda de Dama (denomination of the Grand Cross when granted to ladies), Commander by Number, Commander, Officer, Knight, Lazo de Dama (the degree of Knight when it is granted to ladies), and Cruz de Plata.

The order's current regulations date from 1998 as approved by Royal Decree 2395/1998, of 6 November. Among its provisions, the categories of Banda de Dama, Cruz de Caballero and Lazo de Dama were repealed to avoid possible interpretations of there being gender discrimination. Notwithstanding this, for aesthetic and functional reasons, the ladies who are decorated use reduced versions of the insignia of each degree of the Order.

Officials and grades
The king of Spain (currently Felipe VI) is grand master. The grand chancellor is the minister of foreign affairs. All deeds granting decorations of the Order must bear the signatures of both.  Members of the order at the rank of knight and above enjoy personal nobility and have the privilege of adding a golden heraldic mantle to their coat of arms. Knights at the rank of Grand Cross and Knight of the Collar receive the official style of "His or Her most Excellent Lord". Knights at the rank of commander and commander by number receive the style of "His or Her Most Illustrious Lord". Beneath these two officials of the Order, there are currently several grades:
 First Class
 Knight of the Collar (CYC) (Caballeros del Collar) (limited to 25 people)
 Knight Grand Cross (gcYC) (Caballeros Gran Cruz) (limited to 500 people)
 Second Class
 Commander by Number (cnYC) (Encomienda de Número) (limited to 800 people)
 Commander (comYC) (Encomienda)
 Third Class
 Officer's Cross (ofYC) (Cruz de Oficial)
 Fourth Class
 Knight's Cross (+YC) (Cruz de Caballeros)
 Fifth Class
 Silver Cross (cpYC) (Cruz de Plata)
 Sixth Class
 Silver Medal (Medalla de Plata)
 Bronze Medal (Medalla de Bronce)

The original statutes of the order of 24 March 1815 established the order in three classes. The structure of the order has varied several times since then. The following is a summary of the history of the various grades and medals of the order:
 Knights of the Collar (Caballeros del Collar) – Established 22 June 1927.
 Knights Grand Cross (Caballeros Gran Cruz) – Established 24 March 1815.
 Knight First Class (Caballeros de Primera Clase) – Established 24 March 1815, retitled Commander (Comdador) on 24 July 1815.
 Officer (Oficial) – Established 10 October 1931, abolished 15 June 1938 and restored 5 June 1971.
 Knight Second Class (Caballeros de Segunda Clase) – Established 24 March 1815, retitled Knight (Caballeros) on 24 July 1815.
 Silver Cross (Cruz de Plata) – Established 16 March 1903 to reward civil and palace officials.
 Gold Medal with Laureate (Medal de Oro pero Laureada) – Established on 24 July 1815 for award to European sergeants and enlisted men. Subsequently abolished.
 Gold Medal (Medal de Oro) – Established on 24 July 1815 for award to non-European 'natives'. Subsequently abolished.
 Silver Medal (Medal de Plata) – Established 15 April 1907 to reward non-commissioned officers and junior civil officials.
 Bronze Medal (Medal de Bronce) – Established 15 April 1907 to reward non-commissioned officers and junior civil officials.
Women appointed to an applicable grade are not called Knights (Caballeros). Women are instead appointed as Dames of the Collar (Damas del Collar), Dames Grand Cross (Damas Gran Cruz) or Dame's Cross (Cruz de Damas).

Order decoration
The decoration is a red-enameled cross, with a golden frame.  The outer peaks are fitted with small gold balls.  The center of the medallion contains the inscription "A La Lealtad Acrisolada" (To Proven Loyalty) and "Por Isabel la Católica" (By Isabella the Catholic) on white enamel.  Above the cross is a green enameled laurel wreath with the band ring.

The ribbon is yellow with a white central stripe, except the "Collar", the wearing of which can be replaced by a gold-yellow sash with white stripes on the edges.

References and links

 
Awards established in 1815
1815 establishments in Spain
Isabella the Catholic
Isabella the Catholic, Order of